Phaq'u Q'awa is a  mountain in the Andes of southern Peru. It is located in the Moquegua Region, Mariscal Nieto Province, Carumas District, and in the Tacna Region, Candarave Province, Candarave District. It lies west of a lake named Aqhuya Ch'alla (Ajuachaya, Pasto Grande) and southeast of Wila Wilani (or Ch'ankha Qullu).

Name
The Hispanicized spelling is Pacocahua or Pajojañua.

References

Mountains of Moquegua Region
Mountains of Tacna Region
Mountains of Peru